Luigi Mino Poggi (11 March 1906 – 19 April 1972) was an Italian sailor who competed in the 1936 Summer Olympics and in the 1948 Summer Olympics.

In 1936 he was a crew member of the Italian boat Italia which won the gold medal in the 8 metre class competition.

In 1948 he finished eighth as a crew member of the Italian boat Ciocca II in the 6 metre class event.

References

External links
 
 
 
 

1906 births
1972 deaths
Italian male sailors (sport)
Olympic sailors of Italy
Olympic gold medalists for Italy
Olympic medalists in sailing
Sailors at the 1936 Summer Olympics – 8 Metre
Sailors at the 1948 Summer Olympics – 6 Metre
Medalists at the 1936 Summer Olympics